Mohand Arav Bessaoud (born 24 December 1924 in Taguemount El Djedid, Algeria; died 1 January 2002 in Isle of Wight) was a Kabyle Algerian writer and activist. He was described as the spiritual father of Berberism ("Dda Moh"), and a strong supporter of the Tamazight culture.

Biography

Mohand Arav was part, as soon as 1963, of the early movement that led to the rise of the National Liberation Front. He had published Happy The Martyrs Who Have Seen Nothing in 1963 in which he documented his war experience against the French. This book earned him the death penalty by the Ahmed Ben Bella administration. More precisely, he wrote explicitly how Ramdane Abbane (one of the historic leaders of the Algerian movement) was murdered by Abdelhafid Boussouf, and not killed in combat.

In 1965, Bessaoud fled to France. Along with individuals including Taos Amrouche, Mohammed Arkoun, Abdelkader Rahmani, Mohand Saïd Hanouz, he cofounded the Academie Berbere in Paris in 1966. In 1969, he organized the first Berber music concert, and launched a Berber-focused magazine, Imazighène. That year, the Academie Berbere became Agraw Imazighen. He designed the modern Berber flag in 1970. 

In 1978, following diplomatic pressure from Algeria, France asked Mohand Arav to leave the country. He dissolved the Academie Berbere and settled in the Isle of Wight. In 1997, he returned to Algeria, his last trip to his home country before passing away on 1 January 2002.

Published work
Mohand Arav wrote on the war of independence, its aftermath and the history of the Berbers. He was considered a leading light of Berberism during the 20th and early 21st centuries.
Happy The Martyrs Who Have Seen Nothing, 1963
The FFS: Hope and Betrayal, 1966
Little people for a great cause, or the history of the Berber Academy 1966-1978, 2000
The provisional identity
 A few pages of our history, with Saïd Aït Ameur
Berber names

See also
Academie Berbere
 Berber flag
List of Berbers

References

1924 births
2002 deaths
Berberism in Algeria
Berber activists
Berber writers
Kabyle people
People from Tizi Ouzou Province
Algerian writers
Algerian emigrants to France
French emigrants to the United Kingdom